Chelsea Common was the ground of Chelsea Cricket Club in the 18th century, an area that virtually disappeared under building work in the 19th century.

Records have survived of five matches between 1731 and 1789 which either involved the Chelsea club or were played on the common. The first, played on the common for the high stake of 50 guineas, was Chelsea v Fulham in July 1731. In August 1736 there was an inter-county match on the common between Middlesex and Surrey. The stake was 50 guineas and Middlesex won by 9 runs.

References

1731 establishments in England
Cricket grounds in Middlesex
Cricket in Middlesex
Defunct cricket grounds in England
Defunct sports venues in London
English cricket venues in the 18th century
History of Middlesex
Middlesex
Sport in London
Sports venues completed in 1731
Sports venues in London